{{DISPLAYTITLE:C21H28O3}}
The molecular formula C21H28O3 may refer to:

 Estradiol monopropionate
 Estradiol 3-propionate
 HU-331
 HU-336
 6-Ketoprogesterone
 11-Ketoprogesterone
 Nomegestrol
 Pyrethrin I
 SC-8109
 Segesterone